Matheus Fernando Cavichioli (born 27 July 1986 in Caçador, Santa Catarina) is a Brazilian footballer who plays as goalkeeper for América Mineiro.

Career

Club career 

Matheus Cavichioli started his career on Grêmio as youth player. In 2007, he agreed a loan deal with Figueirense, but was released after played just once on the Campeonato Catarinense, a 2-1 loss against Atlético Ibirama. He was loaned again, this time to Pão de Açúcar, who plays in the lower divisions of Campeonato Paulista. In January 2008, he returned to Grêmio as the third choice goalkeeper. In 2009, Matheus was loaned to Série C side Caxias.

References

External links

1986 births
Living people
Brazilian footballers
Association football goalkeepers
Campeonato Brasileiro Série A players
Campeonato Brasileiro Série B players
Campeonato Brasileiro Série D players
Grêmio Foot-Ball Porto Alegrense players
Figueirense FC players
Sociedade Esportiva e Recreativa Caxias do Sul players
São José Esporte Clube players
Esporte Clube Novo Hamburgo players
Sport Club do Recife players
Clube Esportivo Lajeadense players
Esporte Clube Pelotas players
Veranópolis Esporte Clube Recreativo e Cultural players
Sociedade Esportiva Recreativa e Cultural Brasil players
Esporte Clube Passo Fundo players
Esporte Clube Internacional players
Esporte Clube Juventude players
Oeste Futebol Clube players
Guarani FC players
América Futebol Clube (MG) players